La Niñera is a sitcom in Argentina, based on the U.S. TV series, The Nanny, starring Florencia Peña, Boy Olmi, Roberto Carnaghi and Carola Reyna. The series consisted of two seasons, airing from 2004 to 2005.

Plot 
Flor Finkel, is an extravagant woman who starts working as a nanny for the Iraolas, a very wealthy family, formed by Juan Manuel Iraola, and his three children, Maggie, Agustín and Mica. In addition, the family has a butler named Fidel and Tete, a business partner of Juan Manuel (who is in love with him). Slowly but surely, Flor will give life to the house, turning it into a lovely home.

Cast 
Florencia Peña as Flor Finkel (Fran Fine)
Boy Olmi as Juan Manuel Iraola (Maxwell Sheffield)
Roberto Carnaghi as Fidel (Niles)
Carola Reyna as Teté López Lynch (C.C.)
Agustina Córdova as Maggie Iraola (Margaret)
Malena Luchetti as Micaela Iraola (Grace)
Mariano Colombo as Juan Agustín Iraola (Brighton)
Mirta Busnelli as Silvia Finkel (Sylvia Fine)
Jorgelina Aruzzi as Vale (Val)

Guest stars 
The sitcom had a large number of celebrities who participated in the program, such as comedians and singers. The most prominent were Ricardo Montaner, Pablo Galan, Chayanne, Diego Torres, and others.

2000s Argentine television series
2004 Argentine television series debuts
2005 Argentine television series endings
Telefe original programming
Spanish-language television shows
Television shows set in Buenos Aires
Argentine television series based on American television series